State Route 264 is a state highway in central Utah that connects Sanpete County to Carbon County through Flat Canyon, Boulger Canyon, Upper Huntington Canyon, and Eccles Canyon. It is part of The Energy Loop, a National Scenic Byway.

Route description
From its western terminus at SR-31, SR-264 heads southeast until it reaches Emery County, where it turns to the north. Afterwards it turns back to the east through Carbon County to its eastern terminus at SR-96.

History
The western portion of SR-264, from SR-31 east to the Sanpete-Emery County line, near the north end of Electric Lake, was added to the state highway system in 1915, and became part of SR-31 in 1927. Due to the creation of Electric Lake, a new alignment for SR-31 was designated in 1976, and present SR-264 was given back to the county. The Utah Transportation Commission restored that roadway to the state highway system in 1985 when it created SR-264 along its present route.

Major intersections

References

264
264
 264
 264
 264